Jindřich Panský (born 29 July 1960) is a male former Czech international table tennis player.

He won two silver medals at the 1985 World Table Tennis Championships in the men's doubles with Milan Orlowski and in the mixed doubles with Marie Hrachová. He also competed in the men's singles event at the 1988 Summer Olympics.

See also
 List of table tennis players
 List of World Table Tennis Championships medalists

References

1960 births
Living people
World Table Tennis Championships medalists
Czech male table tennis players
Olympic table tennis players of Czechoslovakia
Table tennis players at the 1988 Summer Olympics
Sportspeople from Plzeň